RFA Appleleaf (A83) was a Leaf-class tanker of the Royal Fleet Auxiliary in service between 1959 and 1970.

References

Tankers of the Royal Fleet Auxiliary
Leaf-class tankers
1955 ships